Prattville is the name of several communities in the United States:
Prattville, Alabama
Prattville, California
Prattville, Michigan
Prattville, Mississippi
Prattville, Oklahoma
Prattville, Utah

See also
 Prattsville (disambiguation)